La Font de la Guatlla is a neighborhood in the Sants-Montjuïc district of Barcelona, Catalonia (Spain).

Background

References

Font de la Guatlla, la
Font de la Guatlla, la